The Luján River (Spanish, Río Luján) runs from its source near Espora about  east of Buenos Aires, Argentina, to its outflow into the Río de la Plata north of the city.
The first Megatherium fossil was found here in 1789.

See also

 List of rivers of Argentina

References

Rivers of Argentina
La Plata basin
Rivers of Buenos Aires Province